was a monorail station in Inuyama, Aichi Prefecture, Japan.
It was closed on December 28, 2008, due to the end of the monorail operation.

Lines
Nagoya Railroad
Monkey Park Monorail Line

Adjacent stations

|-
!colspan=5|Nagoya Railroad

Railway stations in Aichi Prefecture
Defunct railway stations in Japan
Railway stations closed in 2008